Scopula nigrinotata is a moth of the  family Geometridae. It is found in Ethiopia, Ghana, Malawi, Nigeria, Sierra Leone, South Africa, Sudan, Uganda and Zimbabwe.

References

Moths described in 1897
nigrinotata
Lepidoptera of Malawi
Moths of Sub-Saharan Africa
Lepidoptera of Ethiopia
Lepidoptera of Sudan
Lepidoptera of Uganda
Lepidoptera of West Africa
Lepidoptera of Zimbabwe